Pratappur could refer to places in the Indian subcontinent:
 Pratappur (Assembly constituency), a legislative assembly constituency in Allahabad district, and part of Bhadohi (Lok Sabha constituency), Uttar Pradesh, India
 Sirjug Pratappur, a village in Bangladesh
 A village in Siwan District, Bihar, India
 Pratappur, Jharkhand, a community development block in Chatra district in the Indian state of Jharkhand
 Pratappur, Chatra, a village in Chatra district, Jharkhand, India
 The ancient settlement of Marol in Mumbai
 Pratappur, Nepal
 Pratappur, Chhattisgarh
 Pratappur (Chhattisgarh Vidhan Sabha constituency), a legislative assembly constituency centered around the town
 Pratappur, Godda, Jharkhand
 Pratappur, Raebareli, a village in Uttar Pradesh, India